VoteWatch Europe is an independent NGO based in Brussels. VoteWatch compiles voting behaviours of Members of the European Parliament and presents them in graphical and statistical form.

VoteWatch started in May 2009 as a scientific project under the direction of Sarah Hagemann. Later that year it was transformed into an NGO by Simon Hix and Doru Frantescu.

Sources

External links 
 votewatch.eu – Official website

Non-governmental organizations